Petar Bogdan Bakshev or Petar Bogdan ; (Chiprovtsi, Ottoman Empire, 1601 – 1674) was an archbishop of the Roman Catholic Church in Bulgaria, historian and a key Bulgarian National Revival figure. Petar Bogdan restored the Catholic hierarchy. He is most famous for being the author of the first Bulgarian history.

Biography
The biographic data concerning Petar Bogdan is scarce, but the researches confirm that he was born in 1601 in Chiprovtsi in the northwest of Bulgaria and received his name Bogdan. The name Petar was given to the future Archbishop of Sofia after his entering in the Order of St. Francisc in 1618. Probably he was named after his mentor and teacher, and also the first Archbishop of Sofia, Peter Solinat. He came to be well known to the scientific and cultural circles in Bulgaria not until the 1980s, although his life and work coincides with those of already famous men of letters as Petar Parchevich, Filip Stanislavov and Franchesko Soymirovich.

He graduated school in the monastery St. Francisc in Ancona (1620-1623). Petar Bakshev studied later in Vatican from 1623 to 1630, where besides theology he studied also grammar, philosophy, logic, and church history. In 1642 Pope Urban II declared Sofia to be the seat of the Bulgaria's Catholic Archbishopric and appointed Peter Bogdan Bakshev as the Archbishop. The sole purpose of his activity was the social-political, confessional and cultural liberation of Bulgarians from the Ottoman oppression, and the revival of the Bulgarian state. Most Bulgarian historians think of him as the forefather of the Bulgarian National Revival. He had a very good language knowledge and performs the biggest writing activities. Petar Bogdan used Latin, Italian, Greek, Romanian and Turkish.

Together with Petar Parchevich, another highly educated Bulgarian Catholic cleric and diplomat and Franchesko Soymirovich, they visited Austran monarch Ferdinand II, the king of the Polish–Lithuanian Commonwealth Sigismund III Vasa, and his heir, Władysław IV Vasa, as well as Wallachian voivode, Matei Basarab. In 1641-1643 P. Bogdan put significant efforts into the development of the school in Chiprovtsi established in 1625. Bakshev was not afraid to write to the Congregation that the school was useful not only for religion but for the Bulgarians themselves. He asked for teachers and books on theology, as well as on some non-clerical subjects: Grammar, Maths, Philosophy and Logic. Petar Bogdan Bakshev left behind  rich literary heritage.

Bakshev Ridge in Antarctica is named “after Petar Bogdan Bakshev (1601-1674), Catholic Archbishop of Sofia, and author of an early Bulgarian historiography published in 1667.”

Works
His numerous translations and reports are interesting not only as historical readings, but also as itineraries. He is considered to be the creator of the Bulgarian historiography, with his first work "Description of the Bulgarian Kingdom" (1640). In his other works he mentioned also the geographical and ethnic borders of Bulgaria and Bulgarian people in Moesia, Thrace and Macedonia. In his works are also many facts about the past of certain towns and the local villages. Later he wrote History of Serbia, History of Ohrid, History of Sofia and The Bishopric of Prizren – books that  convincingly defend the ethnic and political boundaries of Bulgaria. After two centuries, these boundaries were confirmed with the firman of the Turkish sultan for the formation of the Bulgarian Exarchate, and by the decisions of the 1876 Constantinople Conference of the then Great Powers of Europe.

In 1667 Bakshev finished his major work “History of Bulgaria” and tried to prepare European thought of the liberation of the country. The Vatican library today has only the introduction and the first four chapters of the work. The original is believed to have included 20 chapters. Some data implied that the work was printed in Venice, but there is not a single copy preserved. This book was an end of his long lasting diplomatic work. In the introduction of the book he wrote: “Now when I am too old, the only thing to support me is the thought of my country”. Petar Bogdan's greatest work, a history of Bulgaria, was written a century before the Istoriya Slavyanobolgarskaya of Paisius of Hilendar, but was published after his death. Obsessed by religious activities, this  fighter died in 1674, when he was 72.

A full copy of Petar Bogdan's 200-page history book, titled De antiquitate Patrerni soli, et de rebus Bulgaricis, was found by the Bulgarian historian Liliya Ilieva at the library of Modena University in 2017.

See also
Chiprovtsi Uprising

References

Sources
Петър Богдан Бакшев. Български политик и историк от XVII век, Божидар Димитров 
Discovering the historical figure Peter Bogdan.

17th-century Bulgarian historians
Bulgarian Roman Catholic archbishops
17th-century Roman Catholic archbishops in the Ottoman Empire
1601 births
1674 deaths
People from Chiprovtsi